The Uganda Netball Premier League is the top level netball league in Uganda.

The league consists of two women's divisions, and one men's division.  The competition was suspended in 2020 due to COVID, and returned in 2021.

For the 2022/23 season, the women's division 1 competition is played across four venues, with games grouped into two rounds.  For the season, for the first time, some games were played under floodlights, to allow more fixtures to take place after potential spectators had finished work.  Some games were shown on television.

The 12 teams in women's division 1 in 2022/23 were:

 Africa Renewal University
 Busla Greater Lions
 KCCA
 Mutelx Life Sport
 NIC
 Police
 Posta
 Prisons
 UCU
 Uga X Luweero
 UPDF
 Weyonje

References

Netball competitions in Africa
Sports leagues in Uganda